Weirathmüller (also spelled Weirathmueller) is a German family name, mostly spread in the Innviertel. People with that name also live in the rest of Austria and the Canadien province New Brunswick.

Origin
The name was first mentioned in 1664 (written Weyrethmüller). In this year Georg Weyrethmüller took over the Sigl-estate in Tiefenbach, Taiskirchen im Innkreis.

Surnames